The following Confederate States Army units and commanders fought in the American Civil War's Second Battle of Kernstown on July 24, 1864 in Kernstown, now part of the Virginia city of Winchester. The Union order of battle is shown separately.

Abbreviations used

Military rank
 GEN = General
 LTG = Lieutenant General
 MG = Major General
 BG = Brigadier General
 Col = Colonel
 Ltc = Lieutenant Colonel
 Maj = Major
 Cpt = Captain
 Lt = Lieutenant
 Bvt = Brevet Rank

Other
 w = wounded
 mw = mortally wounded
 k = killed

Army of the Valley
LTG Jubal A. Early

Breckinridge’s Command
MG John C. Breckinridge

Forces reporting directly to Gen. Early

References
 Kernstown Battlefield Association
 Patchan, Scott C. (2007). Shenandoah Summer: The 1864 Valley Campaign. Lincoln & London, Nebraska: University of Nebraska Press. ISBN 978-0-8032-3754-4

Notes

American Civil War orders of battle
Loudoun County in the American Civil War